Guy Buttery (26 November 1983) is a South African musician primarily known as a guitar player.

Cited as “one of South Africa’s most influential artists over the past decade" by The Sunday Independent, Buttery's distinctive acoustic style is influenced by traditional South African culture, music and instrumentation. In live performances, Guy also uses an EBow and a looper to create "synth-like textures". He is influenced by artists such as Michael Hedges, Steve Newman, Madala Kunene, Tony Cox, Tananas, Led Zeppelin, Mark Kozelek and Ralph Towner. Guy has received numerous accolades for his recorded work as well as for his live performances. He has collaborated, toured, supported and recorded with dozens of artists including Dave Matthews, Jethro Tull, multiple Grammy Award winner and founder of Windham Hill Records, William Ackerman, Vusi Mahlasela, Piers Faccini, Kaki King, Dan Patlansky, Shawn Phillips, Violent Femmes, Martin Simpson, Salif Keita, the KZN Philharmonic Orchestra, Steve Newman, Jon Gomm, Preston Reed and many others.

History
Guy Buttery was born in a small coastal town outside of Durban, KwaZulu-Natal in South Africa. Buttery has found a way to play his unique style of guitar that is deeply South African while also speaking a global musical language. He studied Jazz at Kwa-Zulu Natal Technikon with Nibs van der Spuy and later on at the Durban School of Music, where he studied classical guitar with Leandros Stavrou for a brief period. At the age of 18, Guy Buttery’s debut album was nominated for ‘Best Newcomer’ and ‘Best Instrumental’ at the South African Music Awards (SAMA’s) making him the youngest nominee in the history of the event. Guy has since gone on to collect two SAMA’s in 2010 and again in 2014. He has also received numerous other major accolades including The Standard Bank Ovation Award for his live performances at the National Arts Festival, and has been honoured with more of these prestigious awards than any other musician. In 2018, Guy received the highest accolade for a musician in South Africa and was awarded the Standard Bank Young Artist Award. In almost 4 decades of honouring artist throughout the country, this was the first time since its inception that the award was presented to a musician outside of the classical realm. The following year, Guy toured across 5 continents and released a collaborative album, titled "Nāḍī", with Indian born sitar player and vocalist, Kanada Narahari. The album was voted a "Top of the World" release by leading World Music publication Songlines.

Guy has since been invited to perform his works with the 52-piece KZN Philharmonic Orchestra dubbed “Africa’s greatest ensemble” with his solo performance voted “Top Live Show” by The Cape Times and was selected by the public as one of South Africa’s Top Young Personalities by The Mail & Guardian.

With tours cancelled all around the world due to COVID-19, Buttery went into "studio mode" and released 5 albums in 2020. These releases consisted mostly of archival projects including two live releases (one with Derek Gripper and another with Nibs van der Spuy), a collaborative EP with marimba band and horn section The Bandura Express Marimba Ensemble, a demos release featuring outtakes and unreleased recordings surrounding Guy's 2016 self-titled album and a remix album titled "Sonokota EP" featuring producers from Wales, Berlin, Maputo, Cape Town and New York.

In 2021 Buttery released yet another collaborative album, this time with traditional Indian classical musicians Mohd. Amjad Khan (tabla) and Mudassir Khan (sarangi). Recorded in a singular session in India in a largely improvised setting, "One Morning in Gurgaon" continues Guy's love affair with the music of the subcontinent. The record received critical acclaim landing up on numerous album of the year lists including NPR, New Sounds and PopMatters and also charted in the World Music Charts Europe. The record was then picked up in Japan for a vinyl release in a curated album series by Qrates.

Discography
When I Grow Up... (2002)
 Songs from the Cane Fields (2005)
 Fox Hill Lane (2009)
 To Disappear in Place (2011)
 In the Shade of the Wild Fig [with Nibs van der Spuy (2012)
Live in KwaZulu (2013)
Guy Buttery (2016)
Nāḍī [with Kanada Narahari] (2019)
Stam [film score] (2020)
 Live in Cape Town [with Derek Gripper] (2020)
 Guy Buttery & The Bandura Express Marimba Ensemble [with Bandura] (2020)
 The Farm Demos (2020)
 Live in Lisbon [with Nibs van der Spuy] (2020)
 Sonokota EP [with Kanada Narahari] (2020)
Live from Another Time - A Concert Film [featuring Kaki King] (2021)
One Morning in Gurgaon [with Mohd. Amjad Khan & Mudassir Khan] (2021)
Live in Dlinza Forest - A Concert Film [with Nibs van der Spuy] (2021)
In The Shadow of the Wild Fig - single [with Julian Redpath] (2022)

Awards and nominations

 2003 SAMA 'Best Instrumental' and 'Best Newcomer' Award Nominations for "When I Grow Up..." 
 2006 SAMA 'Best Instrumental Album' Nomination for "Songs from the Cane Fields"
 2010 SAMA 'Best Instrumental Album' Award Winner for "Fox Hill Lane"
 2010 Ovation Award - 'Gold' for 'Best Music' at the National Arts Festival 
 2012 SAMA 'Best Instrumental Album' Nomination for "To Disappear in Place" 
 2012 SAMA 'Best Instrumental Album' Nomination for "In The Shade of the Wild Fig"
 2012 Mail & Guardian Top Young South African - Voted by the public 
 2014 Ovation Award - 'Silver' for 'Best Music' at the National Arts Festival 
 2014 SAMA 'Best Classical and/or Instrumental Album' Award Winner for "Live in KwaZulu"
 2016 SAMA 'Best Instrumental Album' Nomination for "Guy Buttery"
 2018 Standard Bank Young Artist Award for 'Music' (South Africa's highest accolade for the Arts)
2020 Songlines Magazine Voted "Nāḍī" a "Top of the World" release for the year
2021 SAMA 'Best Instrumental Album' Nomination for "Live in Lisbon"
2021 SAMA 'Best Instrumental Album' Nomination for "Live in Cape Town"
2021 World Music Charts Europe charted at #10 for "One Morning in Gurgaon"

References

External links
Official website
Guy Buttery, 7" Postcard Video
SAMA Music Awards Winners

Living people
South African guitarists
Male guitarists
Acoustic guitarists
1983 births
Place of birth missing (living people)
21st-century guitarists
21st-century male musicians